In mathematics, the term Thompson group or Thompson's group can refer to either

 The finite Thompson sporadic group Th studied by John G. Thompson
 The finite Thompson subgroup of a p-group, the subgroup generated by the abelian subgroups of maximal order.
 "Thompson subgroup" can also mean an analogue of the Weyl group used in the classical involution theorem
 The infinite Thompson groups  F, T and V  studied by the logician Richard Thompson.

Outside of mathematics, it may also refer to
 Thompson Group Inc.